Stenorrhina is a genus of snakes in the family Colubridae.

Species
Two species are recognized as being valid.
Stenorrhina degenhardtii  – southeastern Mexico, Central America, northwestern South America
Stenorrhina freminvillei  – southern Mexico, Central America

Etymology
The specific name, freminvillei, is in honor of French naval officer and naturalist Christophe-Paulin de La Poix de Freminville.

References

Further reading
Boulenger GA (1896). Catalogue of the Snakes in the British Museum (Natural History). Volume III., Containing the Colubridæ (Opisthoglyphæ and Proteroglyphæ) ... London: Trustees of the British Museum (Natural History). (Taylor and Francis, printers). xiv + 727 pp. + Plates I-XXV. (Genus "Stenorhina [sic]", p. 229).
Duméril AMC (1853). "Prodrome de la classification des reptiles ophidiens ". Mémoires de l'Academie des Sciences, Paris 23: 399-536. (Stenorrhina, new genus, p. 490). (in French).

Stenorrhina
Snake genera
Taxa named by André Marie Constant Duméril